The National Directorate of Intelligence, or (DINI),  is the premier intelligence agency in Peru. The agency is responsible for national, military and police intelligence, as well as counterintelligence.

History
On 27 January 1960, the National Intelligence Service (SIN) was established. Following the presidency of Alberto Fujimori and controversies surrounding SIN, the agency was "deactivated" in November 2000. Under the regulation of Supreme Decree Nº 025-2006-PCM of 4 January 2006, the National Directorate of Intelligence (DINI) was established.

References

Intelligence agencies
Law enforcement in Peru
2006 establishments in Peru
Government agencies of Peru